Erich Kauer (8 January 1908 – 30 December 1989) was a German international footballer.

References

1908 births
1989 deaths
Association football midfielders
German footballers
Germany international footballers
Tennis Borussia Berlin players